In enzymology, a gentamicin 2"-nucleotidyltransferase is an enzyme that catalyzes the chemical reaction

nucleoside triphosphate + gentamicin  diphosphate + 2"-nucleotidylgentamicin

Thus, the two substrates of this enzyme are nucleoside triphosphate and gentamicin, whereas its two products are diphosphate and 2''-nucleotidylgentamicin.

This enzyme belongs to the family of transferases, specifically those transferring phosphorus-containing nucleotide groups (nucleotidyltransferases).  The systematic name of this enzyme class is NTP:gentamicin 2"-nucleotidyltransferase. Other names in common use include gentamicin 2"-adenylyltransferase, aminoglycoside adenylyltransferase, and gentamicin 2"-nucleotidyltransferase.

References

 
 
 

EC 2.7.7
Enzymes of unknown structure